IEC 62304 – medical device software – software life cycle processes is an international standard published by the International Electrotechnical Commission (IEC). The standard specifies life cycle requirements for the development of medical software and software within medical devices. It has been adopted as national standards and therefore can be used as a benchmark to comply with regulatory requirements.

Implications of IEC 62304 for software 
The IEC 62304 standard calls out certain cautions on using software, particularly SOUP (software of unknown pedigree or provenance). The standard spells out a risk-based decision model on when the use of SOUP is acceptable, and defines testing requirements for SOUP to support a rationale on why such software should be used.

Contents

General requirements 

 Quality management system
 Risk management
 Software safety classification

Software development process 

 Software development planning
 Software requirements analysis
 Software architectural design
 Software detailed design
 Software unit implementation and verification
 Software integration and integration testing
 Software system testing
 Software release

Effect of safety classification on required development process documentation

Software maintenance process 

 Establish software maintenance plan
 Problem and modification analysis
 Modification implementation

Software risk management process 

 Analysis of software contributing to hazardous situations
 Risk control measures
 Verification of risk control measures
 Risk management of software changes
 Security and reliability through software quality

Software configuration management process 

 Configuration identification 
 Change control
 Configuration status accounting

Software problem resolution process 

 Prepare problem reports
 Investigate the problem 
 Advise relevant parties 
 Use change control process 
 Maintain records
 Analyse problems for trends 
 Verify software problem resolution 
 Test documentation contents

See also
 International Electrotechnical Commission (IEC)
 List of IEC standards
 IEC 60601
 ISO 14971
 ISO 13485
 ISO 9001
 International Standards for automating the software structural quality
 Time-triggered system (a software architecture that is used in many safety-critical systems)

References

External links 
 

62304
Regulation of medical devices
Software development process
Medical software